Conad, stylized CONAD, is an Italian retail store brand which operates one of the largest supermarket chains in Italy. Created in 1962, Conad is a cooperative system of entrepreneurs, dealing in large-scale distribution. It is structured on three levels: entrepreneur members (owners of retail outlets), cooperatives (large shopping and distribution centers), and the national consortium (a service and market-oriented body for member companies).

Stores
Conad is represented in all 20 regions of Italy with retail stores. In addition to the grocery stores, there are also the distribution lines "Parafarmacia Conad" (pharmacies) with 175 locations, "PetStore Conad" (pet shops) with 68 locations, "Conad Self 24h" (petrol station stores) with 44 offices and "Ottico Conad" (opticians) with 19 offices.

References

External links
 Official website

Italian brands
Companies based in Bologna
Retail companies of Italy
Retail companies established in 1962
Supermarkets of Italy
Supermarkets of San Marino
Supermarkets of Albania
Italian companies established in 1962